The following is a list of notable attacks on civilians attributed to the Janatha Vimukthi Peramuna (JVP), a Sri Lankan Marxist-Leninist, communist group.

Attacks in chronological order

See also
 List of attacks attributed to the LTTE
 List of attacks on civilians attributed to Sri Lankan government forces

References

Janatha Vimukthi Peramuna
Janatha Vimukthi Peramuna
Janatha Vimukthi Peramuna attacks